Ajoblanco (sometimes written ajo blanco) is a popular Spanish cold soup typical from Granada and Málaga (Andalusia). This dish is made of bread, crushed almonds, garlic, water, olive oil, salt and sometimes vinegar. It is usually served with grapes or slices of melon. When almonds were not available, for instance during the post-war period, flour from dried beans was used.

Ajoblanco is sometimes referred to as "white gazpacho".

Extremaduran ajoblanco is a related though somewhat different dish, since it contains egg yolk in the emulsion as well as water, olive oil, garlic and bread, and while vegetables such as tomatoes or cucumbers may be added, it does not usually contain almonds.

History
The dish has its origins in the Roman cuisine, which was introduced the Roman Province of Hispania. It would eventually become a traditional dish of Andalucía.

Characteristics
The bread (generally hard bread) is soaked overnight in order to soften it. The almonds and the garlic are mixed together (sometimes with vinegar) with a mortar and pestle until a white paste is formed. Finally water and olive oil are added and the mixture is beaten until it has an emulsion-like texture.

Serving
When served this way, the soup is thinned so that it can be drunk directly from a glass.

In Málaga, ajoblanco is served with Muscat grapes or, less commonly, other fresh fruit, such as apple or melon. There is a current trend to experiment with other such combinations.

Festivals
Every year in the town of Almáchar, Málaga, a festival is held on 2 September to celebrate ajoblanco.

See also
 List of almond dishes

References

External links
 Authentic Spanish Ajoblanco recipe
 A recipe for Ajoblanco

Andalusian cuisine
Almond dishes
Cold soups
Spanish soups and stews
Garlic dishes